The IOOF Hall and Fromberg Co-operative Mercantile Building was built in 1906 at the west end of downtown Fromberg, Montana.  It was the first brick building in Fromberg and served historically as a department store and as a meeting hall.  It was listed on the National Register of Historic Places in 1993.

It is a two-story flat-roofed building constructed of brick laid in English bond.  It has parapets and corbeled cornices;  the front parapet has a concrete medallion holding metal figures "IOOF," "1906," and the Odd Fellows emblem.

A 1992 review of historic resources in Fromberg commented that "Little is known about the organizational activities of the I.O.O.F in Fromberg", beyond that the I.O.O.F. was the first fraternal organization in Fromberg and that it financed construction of the building in 1906, and then was active for about 20 years.

References

Clubhouses on the National Register of Historic Places in Montana
Buildings and structures completed in 1906
Odd Fellows buildings in Montana
National Register of Historic Places in Carbon County, Montana
1906 establishments in Montana